Nobody Love, Nobody Gets Hurt is the eighth studio album by American country music singer Suzy Bogguss. It was released in 1998 as her final album for Capitol Records.

Content
The album includes the singles "Somebody to Love", "Nobody Love, Nobody Gets Hurt", and "From Where I Stand".

Critical reception
Jana Pendragon of Allmusic rated the album 2.5 stars out of 5, saying that she "runs the gamut as far as the material she elected to use on this project is concerned, from great tunes by Cheryl Wheeler, Bobbie Cryner, and Julie Miller to run-of-the mill country-pop songs". Stephen L. Betts of Country Standard Time praised the title track, as well as the presence of Garth Brooks, Patty Loveless, Trisha Yearwood, Kathy Mattea, and Alison Krauss on backing vocals, saying, "Bogguss' graciousiness in letting others share the spotlight typifies the spirit the album conveys, but it's her own considerable gift for interpretation that draws the listener in subtly, as she weaves bits of magic within each and every track."

Track listing

Personnel
Compiled from liner notes.

Musicians
Pat Bergeson — harmonica on "Train of Thought"
Dan Dugmore — steel guitar and electric guitar on "Take Me Back"
Howard Duck — Hammond B-3 organ
Alison Krauss — viola on "Moonlight and Roses"
Waldo LaTowsky — percussion
Matt Rollings — piano, synthesizer
Brent Rowan — acoustic guitar, electric guitar
Darrell Scott — acoustic guitar, Weissenborn, Dobro, mandolin
Hank Singer — fiddle on "Just Enough Rope" and "Take Me Back"
Leland Sklar — bass guitar
Carlos Vega — drums, percussion

Backing vocalists
Suzy Bogguss — track 1
Gerald Boyd — tracks 1, 5, 6, 10
Garth Brooks — track 8
Doug Crider — track 2
Denny Dadmun-Bixby — track 6, 9
Howard Duck — track 9
Alison Krauss — track 11
Patty Loveless — track 10
Kathy Mattea — track 2
Darrell Scott — track 3
Harry Stinson — tracks 1, 5, 6
Trisha Yearwood — track 11

Technical
Suzy Bogguss — production
 Doug Crider — production
Russ Martin — overdubs
Glenn Meadows — mastering
Ed Seay — recording, mixing

Chart performance

Album

Singles

References

1998 albums
Suzy Bogguss albums
Capitol Records albums